Li Yue is a Chinese businessman, the CEO of China Mobile, the largest mobile network operator in China.

He has a bachelor's degree in telephone exchange from Beijing University of Posts and Telecommunications, an MBA from Tianjin University and a doctorate in business administration from Hong Kong Polytechnic University.

In September 2019, Li Yue retired as China Mobile CEO at the age of 60.

References

Living people
Beijing University of Posts and Telecommunications alumni
Tianjin University alumni
Alumni of the Hong Kong Polytechnic University
Chinese chief executives
21st-century Chinese businesspeople
Year of birth missing (living people)